Red TV is a Serbian pay television channel distributed in Bosnia, Montenegro and Serbia, owned by Pink International Company.

Launched on 4 November 2012 as Pink 2, as Red TV it began broadcasting on 3 October 2020.

Programming
Its broadcast network is based on original entertainment programs of its own production, as well as films.

Shows
 Rap & Roll
 Whatzuuuup

Live program
 Zornjak ("Morning wood")
 Pitam za druga ("Asking for a friend")
 Špic ("Peak")
 Šlic ("Thigh slit")
 Razvlačenje ("Stretching")
 Ne gledam ti ja to ("I'm not watching that")
 REDaljka
 Astro centar ("Astro Center")

"You choose a movie at 11PM" 
A movie that was selected by followers on air every night at 11 PM.

Formerly broadcast by RedTV

Weekly 
 Belgrade Fashion Week
 Muzički Noviteti ("Music news")
 6 Show
 Studio Jam
 Urbane legende ("Urban legends")
 Trending
 1 na 1 sa Trikijem ("One-on-one with Tricky")
 Kimi's time
 Đota Footmania 
 Neki to vole od kuće ("Some like it from home")
 Prerano sa Žoržom i Ignjatom ("Too early for anything..") 
 Kočenje ("Braking")
 Treš Kviz ("Trash quiz")
 Vlažne vesti ("Wet news")
 Gastro Hood
 Ništagram ("I don't do anything")
 Bajke iz podzemlja ("Tales from the underground")
 Seksi saveta ("Sexy tips")
Our Jelena Kleinschnitz solves your love problems, the Seksi Saveta will answer all your questions every Wednesday from 00:00 and you will see and hear that there are bigger problems than you have!
 Kristijanove bajke ("Christian's fairy tales")

Daily 
 5 Grama Instagrama ("5 grams of Instagram")
 Vremenska dijagnoza ("Weather diagnosis")
 Ustanak ("Uprising")
 Hoću da kažem ("I have something to tell you")
 Re:twitter
 Youtuber
 TikToker

Series program 
 Agencija za SIS ("Agency for SIS")
 Zlatni dani ("Golden days")
 Ljubav, Navika, Panika ("Love, habit, panic")
 M(j)ešoviti brak ("Mixed marriage")
 Nek ide život ("Let life go")
 Dobro došli u Štis Krik ("Schitt's Creek")

References

External links

Television stations in Bosnia and Herzegovina
Television stations in Montenegro
Television stations in Serbia
Television channels and stations established in 2012